The 1945 NAIA basketball tournament was held in March at Municipal Auditorium in Kansas City, Missouri. The 8th annual NAIA basketball tournament featured 16 teams playing in a single-elimination format, instead of the normal 32. It is the only tournament to feature only 16 teams. 

The NAIA semifinals featured four new teams for the first time since the inaugural year, 1937. The championship game featured Loyola New Orleans defeating Pepperdine 49–35.

Awards and honors
Many of the records set by the 1945 tournament have been broken, and many of the awards were established much later:
Leading scorer est. 1963
Leading rebounder est. 1963
Charles Stevenson Hustle Award est. 1958
Coach of the Year est. 1954
Player of the Year est. 1994

Bracket

  * denotes overtime.

See also
 1945 NCAA basketball tournament
 1945 National Invitation Tournament

References

NAIA Men's Basketball Championship
Tournament
1945 in sports in Missouri